Jacobus Gijsbert "Koos" Rietkerk (14 December 1927 – 20 February 1986) was a Dutch politician of the People's Party for Freedom and Democracy (VVD) and jurist.

Rietkerk attended the Christian Gymnasium in Haarlem from April 1940 until May 1946 and applied at the Leiden University in June 1946 majoring in Law and obtaining a Bachelor of Laws degree in June 1948 and worked as a student researcher before graduating with a Master of Laws degree in July 1952. Rietkerk worked as a lawyer in Haarlem from January 1953 until October 1956 and also worked as a civil servant for the Immigration and Naturalisation Service (IND) of the Ministry of Justice from January 1953 until October 1956. Rietkerk worked as legal advisor for the Municipalities association (VNG) from October 1956 until January 1959. Rietkerk worked as a trade association executive for the Christian Employers' association (NCW) and served as General-Secretary of the Executive Board from January 1959 until February 1967.

Rietkerk was elected as a Member of the House of Representatives after the election of 1967, taking office on 23 February 1967 serving as a frontbencher and spokesperson for Justice, Social Affairs and the Ombudsman. After the election of 1971 Rietkerk was appointed as State Secretary for Social Affairs in the Cabinet Biesheuvel I, taking office on 28 July 1971. The Cabinet Biesheuvel I fell just one year later on 19 July 1972 and continued to serve in a demissionary capacity until the first cabinet formation of 1972 when it was replaced by the caretaker Cabinet Biesheuvel II with Scholten continuing as State Secretary for Finance, taking office on 9 August 1972. After the election of 1972 Rietkerk returned as a Member of the House of Representatives, taking office on 23 January 1973 but he was still serving in the cabinet and because of dualism customs in the constitutional convention of Dutch politics he couldn't serve a dual mandate he subsequently resigned as State Secretary for Social Affairs on 23 April 1973 and he continued to serve in the House of Representatives as a frontbencher and spokesperson for Justice, Social Affairs and the Ombudsman. In August 1973 Rietkerk was nominated as General-Secretary of the Executive Board of the Industry and Employers' association (VNO), he resigned as a Member of the House of Representatives the same day he was installed as General-Secretary on 1 September 1973. Rietkerk returned as a Member of the House of Representatives following the appointment of Henk Vonhoff as Mayor of Utrecht, he resigned as General-Secretary of the Industry and Employers' association on 1 September 1974 taking office on 11 September 1974 again serving as a frontbencher and spokesperson for Justice, Social Affairs and the Ombudsman. After the election of 1977 the Leader of the People's Party for Freedom and Democracy and Parliamentary leader of the People's Party for Freedom and Democracy in the House of Representatives Hans Wiegel was appointed Deputy Prime Minister and Minister of the Interior in the Cabinet Van Agt-Wiegel, the People's Party for Freedom and Democracy leadership approached Rietkerk as his successor as Parliamentary leader, Rietkerk accepted and became the Parliamentary leader, taking office on 19 December 1977. After the election of 1981 Wiegel returned as Parliamentary leader on 25 August 1981 and he again served as a frontbencher chairing the parliamentary committee for Kingdom Relations and the parliamentary committee for the Ombudsman. After the election of 1982 Rietkerk was appointed as Minister of the Interior in the Cabinet Lubbers I, taking office on 4 November 1982. On 20 February 1986 Rietkerk died after suffering a fatal Heart attack during a meeting in his office at the Ministry of the Interior at the age of 58.

Rietkerk was known for his abilities as a manager and negotiator.

Decorations

References

External links

Official
  Mr. J.G. (Koos) Rietkerk Parlement & Politiek

 
 

 
 

 
 

 
 

 
 

1927 births
1986 deaths
Dutch agnostics
Dutch former Christians
Dutch trade association executives
Former Calvinist and Reformed Christians
Grand Officers of the Order of Leopold II
Knights of the Order of the Netherlands Lion
Leiden University alumni
Academic staff of Leiden University
Members of the House of Representatives (Netherlands)
Members of the Social and Economic Council
Ministers of the Interior of the Netherlands
People from Boskoop
Politicians from Haarlem
People's Party for Freedom and Democracy politicians
Reformed Churches Christians from the Netherlands
State Secretaries for Social Affairs of the Netherlands
20th-century Dutch civil servants
20th-century Dutch jurists
20th-century Dutch lawyers
20th-century Dutch politicians